Sanoura is a village in Jalandhar district  in the state of Punjab, India.

Villages in Jalandhar district